Oleksandr Lebedenko (born 13 August 1989 in Krasnopillya, Sumy Oblast, Ukrainian SSR) is a Ukrainian football striker, who plays for Veres Rivne in the Ukrainian Premier League .

Career
Lebedenko is a product of his native town's FC Yavir Krasnopilya youth sportive school systems.

After the spending 15 years of his career in all age levels representations of FC Yavir – FC Sumy, in July 2016 he signed 1 year deal with the Ukrainian First League club FC Illichivets Mariupol.

References

External links

1989 births
Living people
Ukrainian footballers
Association football forwards
PFC Sumy players
FC Mariupol players
FC Poltava players
FC Helios Kharkiv players
FC Polissya Zhytomyr players
FC Alians Lypova Dolyna players
NK Veres Rivne players
Ukrainian First League players
Ukrainian Second League players